Municipal Library Chalakudy also called Municipal Public Library and Reading Room is one of the public libraries in Chalakudy, Thrissur district, Kerala, India. Another name found associated with this library is Naduvam Kavikal Memorial Library in memory of Naduvam Kavikal. The library was registered on 19, April, 1951 with Kerala Grandhasala Sanghom. Anyone within Chalakudy Municipal can take membership in this library.

References
 Kerala Gazette
 Kerala Gazette, Private Advertisements and Miscellaneous Notifications

1951 establishments in India
Public libraries in India
Libraries in Kerala
Buildings and structures in Chalakudy
Education in Chalakudy
Libraries established in 1951